Herzl is both a given name and a surname. Notable people with the name include:

Given name:
Herzl Berger
Herzl Bodinger
Herzl Rosenblum
Herzl Yankl Tsam

Surname:
Theodor Herzl

See also
Mount Herzl
Herzl (play), 1976 Broadway play

Jewish given names
Jewish surnames
Yiddish-language surnames